Junior Sports Magazine is an Australian television series which aired 1962 to 1965 on ABC. It was a sports news and instructional series aimed at young people. The weekly half-hour series was produced in Sydney and hosted by John O'Reilly.

In Melbourne, an episode intended to air on 23 November 1963 was one of two scheduled programs to be dropped as a result of the John F. Kennedy assassination, news reports of which had resulted in other shows not being shown at their intended times.

See also

List of Australian television series

References

External links

Australian sports television series
English-language television shows
Black-and-white Australian television shows
1962 Australian television series debuts
1965 Australian television series endings
Australian Broadcasting Corporation original programming